The Twenty Mile Creek is a minor waterway, located in the Niagara Peninsula, Ontario, Canada.  The creek is named for the location of its mouth, twenty miles (32 km) west of the Niagara River along the Lake Ontario shoreline. The Indigenous name for the Twenty Mile Creek was the Kenachdaw, which translates to Lead River.

Watershed
The creek begins at the headwaters above the Niagara escarpment in the City of Hamilton, rising near the Hamilton International Airport. From there the creek travels east above the escarpment, before turning north and crossing the Niagara Escarpment at Balls Falls, where it drops . The creek eventually enters Lake Ontario at Jordan Harbour, after passing through the Jordan Marsh, which was created by lake waters flooding the lower reaches of the river valley. The Twenty Mile Creek watershed contains five sub-watersheds including the main channel of Twenty Mile Creek; Gavora Ditch, Spring Creek, North Creek and Sinkhole Creek.

The Twenty Mile Creek watershed contains several areas of natural and scientific interest, environmentally sensitive areas, and regionally significant wetlands.  The upper reaches of the Twenty Mile Creek watershed are characterized by rolling topography with fairly steep slopes in the headwaters. Further downstream, the watershed contains gently rolling to flat topography before the creek flows over the Niagara Escarpment.

Navigation
Historically, the Twenty Mile Creek has been navigable by small craft and canoe as far upriver as Smithville, with the use of portages, most notably around the cataracts at Ball's Falls.  In recent years, rafters, kayakers, and canoes have navigated the rapids above and below Ball's Falls (including Upper Ball's Falls (36")), although the  main cataract has yet to be attempted.  The rapids rate a Class II to Class V (depending on river level) on the International Scale of River Difficulty.

Settlements
The waterway played an essential role in the development of the communities on its banks. Smithville, St. Anns, and Jordan all owe their early activity to industry based upon the creek.  The ghost town of Ball's Falls' development was also due to its location on the Twenty.

Terror plot
The Canadian National trestle bridge near Jordan was allegedly the subject of a terror plot in early 2013.  The alleged plot involved an attempt by Chiheb Esseghaier and Raed Jaser, both non-citizen residents of Canada, to derail the daily New York-Toronto passenger train as it crossed the trestle.  The two men were allegedly affiliates of an Al-Qaeda group operating out of Iran.

References

See also
List of rivers of Ontario

Rivers of the Regional Municipality of Niagara
Tributaries of Lake Ontario
Areas of Natural and Scientific Interest